Van's Aircraft, Inc. is an American kit aircraft manufacturer, founded by Richard "Van" VanGrunsven in 1973.

Van's RV series of aircraft, from the single-seat RV-3 to the latest RV-14, are all-aluminum, low-wing monoplanes of monocoque construction. The RV series of airplanes has been extremely successful, and as of November 2019, about 10,600 RV kits had been completed and flown, and thousands more are under construction. Completion rates currently average about 1.5 per day, making the series the most numerous of all homebuilt aircraft. In 2013, the company announced it would begin selling assembled RV-12 model aircraft as well on a limited basis.

In December 2017 the company reported that its 10,000th aircraft had flown, an RV-7 built in Martinsburg, West Virginia.

The Van's Aircraft factory is located at Aurora State Airport, Oregon.

Regulatory status

RVs are deemed Experimental Amateur Built (EAB) aircraft by the Federal Aviation Administration in the United States and are accepted under the corresponding category by the aviation authorities in many other countries, including the United Kingdom, Canada, New Zealand and Australia. A modified version of the RV-6 was sold to the Nigerian government as a kit-assembled military trainer.

The RV-12iS is available as an experimental light sport aircraft (ELSA) or special light-sport aircraft (SLSA), which allows for commercial use for purposes like rental and flight training.

RV aircraft series

RV-1: single example of a modified Stits SA-3 Playboy built by VanGrunsven in 1965 and modified with a  Lycoming engine, larger tail, modified cowling, modified fuselage and a custom metal wing
RV-2: wooden flying-wing sailplane prototype that was never completed
RV-3: single-seat kit aircraft, aerobatic, debuted in 1972; genesis design for rest of the RV series 
RV-4: two-seat kit aircraft, tandem seating, aerobatic, bubble canopy
RV-5: single example of a small metal single-seat aircraft that was originally flown with a half-Volkswagen engine and then with a two-stroke Rotax 447 engine
RV-6: two-seat, side-by-side seating aircraft, aerobatic; the most-built model of the RV series and likely the most popular kitplane ever produced
RV-7: modernized kit with similarity to the RV-6, with longer wingspan and larger rudder, aerobatic; replaced the RV-6 model
RV-8: two-seat tandem seating, aerobatic aircraft, with larger cockpit and greater overall size than the RV-4
RV-9: two seat, side-by-side aircraft; non-aerobatic, with larger wing and more docile handling qualities than others in the RV line
RV-10: largest of the RV fleet with four seats, non-aerobatic, tricycle landing gear only
RV-11: single-seat motorglider; under development until c. 2012
RV-12: two-seat, side-by-side light-sport aircraft, updated to RV-12iS variant in 2017 
RV-13: designation not used
RV-14: two-seat, side-by-side aerobatic aircraft, considered similar to the RV-7 in design but larger and roomier
RV-15: future high-wing, back-country capable aircraft

Timeline

Gallery

References

External links

 

Aircraft manufacturers of the United States
Companies based in Marion County, Oregon
Aurora, Oregon
Manufacturing companies established in 1973
Privately held companies based in Oregon
1973 establishments in Oregon